The 13th season of the Derbyshire Girls & Ladies League.

Division 1

Division 2

References

Eng
FA Women's National League seasons
Wom
1